Cruz  is a city in Ceará, state of Brazil. The city lies on the Acaraú River near the northern Atlantic coast. As of 2020 the population was estimated at 24,977.

Transport 
The municipality is served by the Jericoacoara Airport .

References

External links

Populated coastal places in Ceará
Municipalities in Ceará